Ricardo Fabiano Chahini de Araujo (born 16  February  1998), also known as  Ricardinho, is a Brazilian freestyle footballer from Belém do Pará, who was the 2019 Red Bull  Street Freestyle world champion.

Career
Ricardinho started Freestyle Football in 2009 when he was 10 years old.

Honours
 World Champion Red Bulls street style 2019.
 Red Bull Street Style World Finalist 2019.
 Brazilian Champion Red bull:3` 2014, 2017, 2019.
 Vice World Champion World Masters 2018.
 Brazilian Champion Redbull 2018.
 Runner-up Redbull 2018.
 National Champion at Arnold 2018.
 Latin American Champion:2` 2016, 2017.
 SuperBall World Open 3rd place 2015.
 South American Champion 2016, 2017.
 SuperBall World Open Champion 2017.
 3rd Place in the Superball World Championship (2015).
 Brazilian runner up 2014.
 South American runner up 2014.
 Latin American Vice Champion (2014).
 Brazilian Champion street cup (2014).
 Brazilian runner-up (2013)

References

External links
 RedBull Street Style Information
 The WFFA Ricardo Chahini
 
 
 

1998 births
Living people
Freestyle footballers
Brazilian sportspeople
Street football
Sportspeople from Belém